Yong–Quan Xiang is a Xiang Chinese language spoken in Guilin and southern Hunan that does not fit into the traditional New Xiang–Old Xiang dichotomy. It is geographically adjacent to the Old Xiang dialects that it was traditionally grouped with.

A representative dialect is Qiyang.

References 

Xiang Chinese